Tells may refer to:

Tells (band), a British experimental band formed in 2005
Tells Peak, a mountain in California

See also
 Tell (disambiguation)